The Nairobi Marathon is an annual road running competition over the marathon distance usually held in October in Nairobi, Kenya.  First held in 2003, the competition expanded and now includes a half marathon race along with the main race.

It was part of "The Greatest Race on Earth", fully sponsored by Standard Chartered Bank. The other three legs of this four-marathon race were the Hong Kong Marathon, the Mumbai Marathon and the Singapore Marathon.

The 2020 edition of the race was cancelled due to the coronavirus pandemic.

Course 

The marathon course starts on Uhuru Highway outside Nyayo National Stadium and heads roughly northward, wandering through the city center, before heading east on Wangari Maathai Road.  The course then hits a turnaround point, and heads back to the stadium before heading southeast on Mombasa Road.  The segment on Mombasa Road is a loop that is repeated twice before the course ends with a finish inside the stadium.

Winners 

Key:  Course record

Marathon

Half marathon

Notes

References 

 The Standard, October 22, 2006: The evolution of Nairobi International Marathon

External links 
 

Marathons in Kenya
Sport in Nairobi
Recurring sporting events established in 2003
2003 establishments in Kenya